The 2021 GT & Prototype Challenge powered by Hankook was the fifth season of the GT & Prototype Challenge. It began at the Hockenheimring on 21 May and ended at TT Circuit Assen on 31 October.

Calendar

Entry list

Race results
Bold indicates overall winner.

Championships standings

References

External links

GT & Prototype Challenge
GT & Prototype Challenge
GT & Prototype Challenge